The SCR-245 Radio was a mobile MF/HF Signal Corps Radio used by the U.S. Army before and during World War II, for short range ground communications, It was one of the first crystal controlled sets used by the Army.

Use
The SCR-245 was standardized on 10 June 1937, and used by Armored forces for command and control of tank units. It replaced the earlier SCR-189 and was used primarily in the early M2, M3 light tanks as well as the early M3 medium tanks. Their large size required them to be mounted in the tanks sponsons. It was replaced by the SCR-508 sets.

Components
 BC-223 Transmitter 
Modes: AM, CW. 
Frequency range: 4 crystal-controlled channels, 2.0 MHz to 4.5 MHz. 
RF Power output: 10 Watts. 
Range: CW 45 Miles. Voice 20 Miles.
 BC-312 Receiver (See BC-342)
 PE-55 Dynamotor (12Volt input)
 MP14 or MP37 mast base and 15 foot whip antenna.

Variants
 SCR-210 Receiver only set

See also

 Signal Corps Radio
 Crystal oscillator

References

General references
 TM 11-487 Electrical Communications Equipment
 TM 11-227 APRIL 1944 Radio Communication Equipment (Directory)
 TM 11-272
 Radio to free Europe

External links
 SCR List (archived) — US Army Signal Corps Museum
 BC List — US Army Signal Corps Museum

Amateur radio transmitters
Military radio systems of the United States
World War II American electronics
Military electronics of the United States
Military equipment introduced in the 1930s